Metriochroa carissae is a moth of the family Gracillariidae. It is known from Ethiopia.

The larvae feed on Carissa edulis. They mine the leaves of their host plant. The mine has the form of a long, serpentine mine on the upper side of the leaf. It is silvery white and has many windings.

References

Endemic fauna of Ethiopia
Phyllocnistinae
Insects of Ethiopia
Moths of Africa